This article lists events that occurred during 1980 in Estonia.

Incumbents

Events
 20-30 July – 1980 Summer Olympics sailing events take place at the new Olympic Yachting Centre in Tallinn.
 Youth riots in the capital of the Soviet Republic of Estonia were quickly forced down.
 October – Letter of 40 intellectuals.

Births
18 April – Priit Võigemast, Estonian actor
27 October – Tanel Padar, Estonian singer
24 December – Maarja-Liis Ilus, Estonian singer

Deaths

References

 
1980s in Estonia
Estonia
Estonia
Years of the 20th century in Estonia